Line Mobile - Finn Mobile  (stylised as Line Mobile - Finn Mobile) is a division by Line Corporation operates mobile virtual network operator service in Japan and Taiwan, while in Thailand it operates as a light MVNO service provide ( MVNO network structure By DTAC ( DTN ) r. Unlike LINE's other service LINE Out (which operates as a paid VoIP service), Finn Mobile
offers SIM card plans.

History
Line Mobile was launched in Japan in September 2016 by LINE MOBILE Corporation, a subsidiary of Line Corporation. It initially operates on the NTT DoCoMo network. In Japan, Line Mobile offers plans including free access to LINE application and social network services.

In January 2018, it is announced that LINE Corporation and Softbank Corp had agreed a partnership for Line Mobile. As a result of the partnership, Softbank will hold 51% stake in Line Mobile Corporation. Line Mobile added Softbank network to its service starting July 2018.

International operations

Thailand
Line Mobile operates in Thailand as a sub-licensing brand on the traditional mobile operator dtac, as its agreement with Line Mobile Thailand is limited to brand licensing. The setup, which is similar to Virgin Mobile's MVNO licensing setup was challenged by telecom consultants, and the network operators, Advanced Info Service and TrueMove, for setting up a MVNO, without a MVNO license, to avoid paying regulatory fees.

The National Broadcasting and Telecommunications Commission (NBTC), decided Line Mobile would not have to apply for a license under the mobile virtual network operator (MVNO) scheme, despite being classified as a MVNO in Japan and Taiwan. However, in its resolution, the NBTC board will keep monitoring Line Mobile and ordered it to amend its online registration system as it violates existing regulations, which require registration to be done at a service point in person with an ID card. The NBTC also ordered Line Mobile to improve awareness of the product's features and ownership to its customers, many of whom may lack of essential information about the service, said NBTC secretary-general Takorn Tantasith. "Line Mobile must strictly adhere to the order of the NBTC board, or face punishment by the regulator," Mr Takorn said.

On September 16, 2019 Line Mobile Thailand, announced it would be renamed to Finn Mobile.

Dtac has yet provided any public information about the number of subscribers of Finn Mobile, since its launch a year ago. However, the app needed to use the service, has 50,000+ downloads on Google Play, and a rating of 4.6 (out of five) based on 5,200 ratings on Apples App store, as of September 2020.

Taiwan
Line Mobile operates in Taiwan as an MVNO services operates on the FarEasTone network. Line Mobile offers cheaper broadband plans with throttled speed, as well as standard 4G speed in regular price.

On 19 April 2021, Line Mobile in Taiwan was merged into FarEasTone network due to contract expiration.

References

Naver Corporation
Mobile phone companies of Japan